The Golden Book Awards were created to honor Uruguayan and foreign best-selling books published in Uruguay.

The prizes are awarded each December in the categories general interest, nonfiction, children's and young adult fiction, and adult fiction for national and foreign books.

2013 winners

Uruguayan
  by Cecilia Curbelo
 Hasta la última gota by Federico Castillo and Horacio Varoli
  by

International
 The One Direction Story by Danny White
 Fifty Shades of Grey by E. L. James
 Toda la verdad y nada más que la verdad by 
 2012 Chinese Horoscope by

2014 winners

Uruguayan
  by Cecilia Curbelo
  by Diego Fischer
  by Hugo Burel

International
  by 
  by Isabel Allende
 The Fault in Our Stars by John Green

2015 winners

Uruguayan
  by Cecilia Curbelo
 Una oveja negra al poder by Andrés Danza and Ernesto Tulbovitz
 Educar sin culpa by Alejandro de Barbieri
 Voces anónimas (Limbo) by Guillermo Lockhart

International
  by Isabel Allende
 2014 Chinese Horoscope by Ludovica Squirru
  by Juan Pablo Escobar
 Paper Towns by John Green

2016 winners

Uruguayan
  by Diego Fischer
  by Ruperto Long
 Los patos que no tiene ombligo by Susana Olaondo

International
 The Girl on the Train by Paula Hawkins
  by Pilar Sordo
 Harry Potter and the Cursed Child by J. K. Rowling

2017 winners

Uruguayan
 Lentejas by Susana Olaondo
 Con los días contados by 
 Una historia americana by Fernando Butazzoni
 2017  from the Crandon Institute

International
 Más allá del invierno by Isabel Allende
 Origin by Dan Brown
 Pablo Escobar in fraganti by Juan Pablo Escobar
 Wigetta en las Dinolimpiadas by Vegetta777 and Willyrex
 2017 Chinese Horoscope by Ludovica Squirru

References

Uruguayan literary awards